Blind Man's Bluff is a 1952 British crime film directed by Charles Saunders and starring Zena Marshall, Sydney Tafler, and Anthony Pendrell. It was produced as a second feature for release on the lower half of a double bill.

Cast
 Zena Marshall as Christine Stevens
 Sydney Tafler as Rikki Martin
 Anthony Pendrell as Roger Morley
 Russell Napier as Stevens
 Norman Shelley as Inspector Morley
 John Le Mesurier as Lefty Jones
 Tony Doonan as Charley
 Barbara Shaw as Clare Raven
 Joan Hickson as Mrs. Kipps
 Michael Ward as Jewellers Assistant

References

Bibliography
 Chibnall, Steve & McFarlane, Brian. The British 'B' Film. Palgrave MacMillan, 2009.

External links
 

1952 films
Films directed by Charles Saunders
1952 crime films
British crime films
British black-and-white films
1950s English-language films
1950s British films